"I Wanna Hold You" is a song by English pop rock band McFly. It was released on 17 October 2005 as the third single from their second studio album, Wonderland (2005). It was written by band members Tom Fletcher, Danny Jones, and Dougie Poynter. The song peaked at number three in the UK Singles Chart and number 13 in Ireland.

Background

The original version of the song was different from the single, this version was written by Tom Fletcher and Danny Jones. Its lyrics were "less mature" and resembled a song more suited to the Room on the 3rd Floor album than the new and "grown-up" Wonderland album. The track was therefore edited. It was re-written by Tom and Dougie and re-recorded to be added onto McFly's second studio album, but not before it was featured on the album demo which has subsequently been spread across the internet. The new album version however was still criticised. Its lyrics "I'd destroy the world for you" were deemed inappropriate for a pop song. So McFly edited and re-recorded the song a further time changing the lyrics to "I'll change the world for you" instead.

Music video
McFly's video for "I Wanna Hold You" is more mature, removing McFly's signature comedic sketches for a serious performance-based video. The band, suited up, perform the whole video in front of an orchestra of beautiful women in blonde wigs. During the guitar solo, a woman appears to rise through the ground before McFly, dripping with a metallic looking paint.

Track listings
UK CD1
 "I Wanna Hold You"
 "Mr. Brightside"

UK CD2
 "I Wanna Hold You"
 "Easy Way Out"
 "Interview – Tom Fletcher interviews Danny Jones"
 "I Wanna Hold You" (instrumental)

UK DVD single
 "I Wanna Hold You" (audio)
 "New McFly Home Movie"
 "I Wanna Hold You" (video)

Charts

Weekly charts

Year-end charts

References

2005 singles
2005 songs
Island Records singles
McFly songs
Song recordings produced by Hugh Padgham
Songs written by Danny Jones
Songs written by Dougie Poynter
Songs written by Tom Fletcher
Universal Records singles